Hiroto Ohhara (大原洋人, Ōhara Hiroto, born 14 November 1996 in Chiba) is a Japanese surfer. He placed 4th overall at the 2021 ISA World Surfing Games, earning qualification for the 2020 Summer Olympics. He competed in the men's shortboard event at the Olympics, where he was eliminated in the quarterfinals by eventual champion Ítalo Ferreira of Brazil.

References

Japanese surfers
Living people
1996 births
Surfers at the 2020 Summer Olympics
Olympic surfers of Japan
World Surf League surfers
People from Chiba (city)